Dysodia ignita is a moth of the family Thyrididae first described by Francis Walker in 1865. It is found in India, Sri Lanka and Bangladesh.

References

Moths of Asia
Moths described in 1866
Thyrididae